One Last Time: An Evening with Tony Bennett and Lady Gaga is a television special by American singers Tony Bennett and Lady Gaga. It originally aired on November 28, 2021, on CBS while being simulcast on Paramount+. Consisting of select duets and solo performances, it was part of the promotion of their second collaborative studio album, Love for Sale, released in October 2021. A celebration of Bennett's 95th birthday, the special was recorded on August 3 and 5, 2021, when Bennett and Gaga presented a pair of shows at Radio City Music Hall in New York City. They were Bennett's final public performances, as he retired shortly after from performing live due to his health condition.

The duo was joined on stage by a 41-piece orchestra and musicians related to both artists. Before its release, backstage content of the shows were documented in CBS' television news magazine 60 Minutes, while their performance of "Anything Goes" broadcast on The Late Show with Stephen Colbert as a preview on November 23, 2021. When aired, the special was watched by 6.38 million viewers and had a positive critical response, receiving four nominations at the 74th Primetime Emmy Awards.

Background and release 
Tony Bennett and Lady Gaga first met in 2011 at the Robin Hood Foundation gala in New York City after Gaga's performance at the event. The meeting culminated in their first duet, "The Lady Is a Tramp", then their first collaborative album, Cheek to Cheek (2014), and multiple live performances together, including a concert tour.

In a statement, Darren Pfeffer, executive vice president of Madison Square Garden Entertainment, announced the duo's August 3 and 5, 2021, One Last Time double performance at Radio City Music Hall as an opportunity "to honor their decade long friendship and celebrate Mr. Bennett's 95th birthday." They were promoted as Bennett's final live performances in New York City, and later they were announced to be his final public performances of his career overall, as he retired from performing live on "doctors' orders". Bennett was diagnosed with Alzheimer's disease in 2016. Although he could remember all the songs, his family members were unsure what effect his condition would have on the shows. The preparation for the concerts were more challenging than the duo's previous ones, and Gaga had to keep communication with Bennett simple to make herself understood. After the first concert, Susan Benedetto, the singer's wife said that "once he saw the audience (...) and he raises his hands, (...) I knew we were alright because he became himself. He just turned on. You know, it was like a light switch."

In September 2021, it was announced that as part of the rollout for Bennett and Gaga's second and final collaborative album, Love for Sale, the duo partnered with ViacomCBS for three different specials. The first one was One Last Time, the filmed rendering of the two concerts the pair did at Radio City Music Hall. Before the special debuted, the preparations and behind-the-scenes of the shows were documented in CBS' news magazine 60 Minutes, while the full performance of "Anything Goes" aired on The Late Show with Stephen Colbert as a preview on November 23, 2021. One Last Time simultaneously premiered on CBS and became available on streaming service Paramount+ on November 28, 2021.

Synopsis 
The special starts as Gaga appears on stage in a half crystal-embellished, half feathered dress with a dramatic slit. She performs "Luck Be a Lady" and enlists the audience in celebrating Bennett's 95th birthday. She then performs "Orange Colored Sky", a song Bennett heard her sing on the day they first met. After switching to a shiny, black "French maid-inspired cocktail" dress, she continues by performing "Let's Do It" from the duo's Cole Porter-tribute album Love for Sale, and recounts how Porter was a longtime inspiration for her. The song starts as a soft, piano rendition, before switching to a "rousing version". Before Gaga's final solo song, she encourages the audience to make Bennett smile and laugh, then dons a top hat and performs "New York, New York".

After a curtain drop, Bennett appears, leaning on his musical director Lee Musiker's piano, and performs "Watch What Happens" and "Steppin' Out with My Baby". His next number is a quiet, jazz guitar-plucked rendition of "Fly Me to the Moon". All of his solo performances end with the audience's standing ovation. Gaga rejoins Bennett in a gold sequin frock and matching capelet, and sings "Happy Birthday" to him with the audience. The two then perform "The Lady Is a Tramp", their first recorded duet from 2011. They return to the Cole Porter songbook with "Love for Sale" and "Anything Goes". Bennett then closes out with his signature song, "I Left My Heart in San Francisco". Gaga comes back on stage, and speaks to Bennett: "Tony, we're all so grateful to have witnessed your talent, your generosity, your creativity, and your kindness, and your service throughout all these years. Mr. Bennett, it would be my honor to escort you off the stage." The two then slowly leave together, with Bennett waving goodbye to the audience and the band playing them off.

Reception 
Writing for W Magazine, Andrea Whittle called the concert a "sparkly, campy, emotional night", and highlighted Bennett for being "remarkably commanding". Vulture Hilary Hughes thought that the show was "miraculous, magnificent", and noted that despite his age and medical condition, Bennett's "vibrato rarely warbled off-pitch" and he "rolled through 17 songs in total, [...] with hardly a stumble over a single lyric". The Wall Street Journal John Anderson opined that  Bennett's "pitch may not be what it once was, but the sense of rhythm is undiminished, the timing is impeccable". While he called Gaga's dancing "sometimes awkward", he complimented her vocal skills and highlighted her visible "selflessness" towards her partner as one of core element to the show's success. Writing for USA Today, Patrick Ryan complimented both singers, saying that Gaga "was both sultry and sincere throughout her standards-filled set", and Bennett "was as spry and charismatic as ever". Johnny Loftus from Decider stated that the special is "both a fitting public farewell for a musical legend and a fun throwback to the golden age of live entertainment". One Last Time: An Evening with Tony Bennett and Lady Gaga attracted 6.38 million viewers and garnered a 0.44/3 rating in the 18–49 demographic during its original broadcast, on November 28, 2021.

Awards and nominations

Credits and personnel 
Credits and personnel adapted from the concert special program.
 Tony Bennett – lead vocals
 Lady Gaga – lead vocals

Tony Bennett Quartet

 Lee Musiker – musical director, piano
 Harold Jones – drums
 Gray Sargent – guitar
 Marshall Wood – bass

Lady Gaga Quintet

 Brian Newman – band leader, trumpet
 Alex Smith – piano
 Daniel Foose – bass
 Steve Kortyka – saxophone
 Donald Barrett – drums

Orchestra

 Jill Dell'Abate – conductor
 Tia Allen – viola
 Caleb Burhans – viola
 Hayden Oliver – viola
 Yuko Naito – viola
 Randy Andos – bass trombone
 Mariko Anraku – harp
 Nuno Antunes – clarinet
 Philip Payton – violin
 Antoine Silverman – violin
 Hiroko Taguchi – violin
 Belinda Whitney – violin
 Laura Frautschi – violin
 Maggie Gould – violin
 Anna Luce – violin
 Hae Young Ham – violin
 Robin Braun – violin
 Sean Carney – violin
 Monica Davis – violin
 Fred Gnaman – violin
 Maxim Mostin – violin
 Chala Yancy – violin
 James Burton – trombone
 Darius Christian Jones – trombone
 Mike Davis – trombone
 Braxton Cook – alto sax/flute
 Brandon George Patrick – flute
 Kim Lewis – flute
 David Finck – bass
 Frank Greene – trumpet
 Tony Kadleck – trumpet
 Brandon Lee – trumpet
 Jon Owens – trumpet
 Aaron Heick – alto sax/oboe
 Emily Bruausa – cello
 Clarice Jensen – cello
 Adele Stein – cello
 Diane Lesser – oboe
 Dave Mann – tenor sax/flute
 Dave Riekenberg – bari sax/bass clarinet
 Andy Snitzer – tenor sax/clarinet

Production

 Alex Coletti – director
 Allison Roithinger – producer
 Gillian Appleby – supervising producer
 Chris Vineyard – producer
 Jennifer Lebeau – producer
 Leroy Bennett – production and lighting designer
 Dae Bennett – music mixing and editing
 Michael Bearden – conductor and musical director
 Lizz Zanin – associate director
 Julie Lorusso – associate director
 Benny Almonte – stage manager
 Steven Van Patten – stage manager
 Mari Keiko Gonzalez – editor
 Guy Harding – editor
 Bales Karlin – production manager

Notes

References

External links 
 One Last Time: An Evening with Tony Bennett and Lady Gaga on CBS.com
 One Last Time: An Evening with Tony Bennett and Lady Gaga on Paramount+
 

2021 in American television
2021 in music
2021 television specials
Lady Gaga
2020s American television specials
CBS television specials
Concert films